The East Pyongyang Grand Theatre is a 2,500-seat theatre located in the North Korean capital, Pyongyang. It was the site of the 2008 concert by the New York Philharmonic, which was the first significant cultural visit to North Korea by the United States since the Korean War.

The hall was built in 1989 and is normally a venue for performances that celebrate North Korea's dynastic leaders and national achievements. The December before the concert, it had hosted an opera honoring Kim Jong-suk, the mother of North Korean leader Kim Jong-il.

On New Year's Day 2007, following reconstruction, the theatre hosted the Mansudae Art Troupe.
Its "massive" stage needed an acoustic shell built to properly project the orchestra's sound. The theatre was specifically chosen by Zarin Mehta, who rejected the home of the North Korea State Symphony as too small.

The overall size is more than 62,000 square meters. A colonnaded great hall (lobby) includes a mural of Ulrim Falls. According to a Reuters journalist, its architecture is "bland communist", and a "hulking, ramshackle structure the locals struggle to keep heated and lit at night."

Gallery

See also
List of theatres in North Korea

References

External links

Music venues completed in 1989
Indoor arenas in North Korea
Buildings and structures in Pyongyang
Theatres completed in 1989
Theatres in North Korea
Murals in North Korea
1989 establishments in North Korea
20th-century architecture in North Korea